The Independence Police Department serves the citizens of Independence, Missouri, a city of approximately 117,213 inhabitants (as of July 1, 2011) located in Jackson County, Missouri, just east of Kansas City.  According to the department, its mission is "to protect life, individual liberty and the property of all people within the City of Independence; to develop and maintain a positive relationship with members of the community; and to foster a positive work environment for police employees." The department is also under the jurisdiction of the Jackson County Sheriff's Office.

History
The Independence Police Department was created on August 8, 1882, when the "Night Watch" ordinance was repealed and a new ordinance entitled "Police" was approved. The "Police" ordinance allowed for a maximum of five men to be assigned to two watches, with a pay of $1.30/shift.  The Independence Police Department has since grown to over 300 employees, including 207 sworn police officers.

Resources
The Independence Police Department has a broad array of specialized services, including tactical operations (SWAT), K-9, bomb disposal, narcotics, accident investigation, motorcycles, crime scene investigations, community services, and school resource officers. The Ford Crown Victoria is the standard patrol car, the color scheme is black hood and trunk with white doors and grey decals that say Independence Police. The previous color scheme was all white cars with 2 red stripes going diagonal on the door and says Independence Police.  With the discontinuation of the Crown Victoria Police Interceptor, IPD has been transitioning to the Ford Police Interceptor Sedan and Utility, now painted in all black. In 2017, IPD Officers began carrying the Glock 17 (9mm) as their issued sidearm. Prior to that, they carried the Sig Sauer P226R .357 sig.

Fraternal Order of Police
Independence commissioned police officers and civilian employees can become members of the Missouri Fraternal Order of Police.

See also

List of law enforcement agencies in Missouri
Independence, Missouri

References

External links 
 Independence Police Department Homepage
 Missouri FOP Lodge #1

Independence, Missouri
Municipal police departments of Missouri
Government agencies established in 1882
1882 establishments in Missouri